The 2013–14 Belmont Bruins men's basketball team represented Belmont University during the 2013–14 NCAA Division I men's basketball season. The Bruins, led by 28th year head coach Rick Byrd, played their home games at the Curb Event Center and were members of the Ohio Valley Conference in the East Division. They finished the season 26–10, 14–2 in OVC play to be champions of the East Division and overall regular season OVC champions. They advanced to the championship game of the OVC tournament where they lost to Eastern Kentucky. As regular season conference champions who failed to win their conference tournament, they received an automatic bid to the National Invitation Tournament where they defeated Green Bay and Robert Morris to advance to the quarterfinals where they lost to Clemson.

Roster

Schedule

|-
!colspan=9 style="background:#002469; color:#cf142b;"| Regular season

|-
!colspan=9 style="background:#002469; color:#cf142b;"| Ohio Valley tournament

|-
!colspan=9 style="background:#002469; color:#cf142b;"| NIT

* The December 11 game was postponed after Fairfield's flight to Nashville was cancelled to due inclement weather. The game was rescheduled for January 20.

References

Belmont Bruins men's basketball seasons
Belmont
Belmont